The Slovenia national handball team represents Slovenia in international handball matches. Their biggest success is the silver medal from the 2004 European Men's Handball Championship, as well as claiming third place at the 2017 World Men's Handball Championship.

Competitive record

Olympic Games

World Championship

European Championship

Team

Current squad
Squad for the 2023 World Men's Handball Championship.

Head coach: Uroš Zorman

Caps and goals are correct as of 29 January 2023, after the 2023 World Men's Handball Championship.

Statistics

Most matches played

Last updated: 29 January 2023Source: rokometna-zveza.si

Most goals scored

Last updated: 29 January 2023Source: rokometna-zveza.si

Head coaches
Since 1992, the Slovenian national team has been managed by a total of twelve head coaches. Tone Tiselj, Miro Požun and Slavko Ivezič are the only coaches with more than one spell.

1990s and 2000s

2010s and 2020s

References

External links
 
IHF profile

Handball in Slovenia
Men's national handball teams
Handball